This is a partial discography of Mozart's opera, Così fan tutte.

Recordings

External links
 List of recordings, operadis-opera-discography.org.uk

Opera discographies
Operas by Wolfgang Amadeus Mozart